Park, or Park Ward, is a ward of Wolverhampton City Council, West Midlands. It is located to the west of the city centre, and covers parts of the suburbs Bradmore, Compton, Finchfield, Merridale, Newbridge and Whitmore Reans. It borders the St Peter's, Graiseley, Merry Hill, Tettenhall Wightwick and Tettenhall Regis wards. It forms part of the Wolverhampton South West constituency.

Geography
Its name comes from the fact that two of the city's main parks, West Park and Bantock Park, lie within its boundaries. Two of the city's main thoroughfares are contained largely within the ward, namely the A41 Tettenhall Road and the Compton Road (A454).

The Halfway House on Tettenhall Road was formerly a coaching house on the London to Holyhead route and as the name suggests, was the halfway point. It was a pub for many years but and closed (2009) to reopen as a pharmacy.

Main sights
Park contains the Chapel Ash conservation area and also the Parkdale conservation area. Some other interesting architecture can be seen within the ward, particularly on the Tettenhall Road, such as first Mayor of Wolverhampton, George Thorneycroft's House.

Economy
The ward contains the Marstons Park Brewery, one of the city's main employers. Other employers in the ward tend to be office or school based but there are also a number of well-known pubs and restaurants. The city's now closed Eye Infirmary was located at the top of Compton Road in Chapel Ash, the site is now awaiting redevelopment as is the nearby site of the old Quarterhouse pub, now demolished.

Education
Also inside Park ward are a number of schools, including Wolverhampton Grammar School, Wolverhampton Girls' High School, St Peter's Collegiate Academy and St Edmund's Catholic Academy, as well as numerous Primary schools. The Compton campus of the University of Wolverhampton is there, as is the Paget Road campus of the City of Wolverhampton College.

References

External links
University of Wolverhampton
City of Wolverhampton College
Wolverhampton Grammar School

Wards of Wolverhampton City Council